Qormi Hockey Club is a field hockey club from Qormi, Malta. The club was founded in 1971.

History 
Hockey in the city of Qormi dates back to the 1970s.

A teacher at the then Ġużé Galea Secondary School, in San Ġorġ, Joseph Kerr, called Chossie (or Ċossi), formed a hockey team made up of students. Kerr acted as the first coach.

The sport developed beyond the school; a society was formed. It had dire beginnings, as the club had to meet in a garage or cellar. Eventually, the club built its own complex, including a hockey pitch. The pitch has a synthetic turf surface.

Nursery 
The club operates an academy to nurse young players. Teams of Under 11, Under14 and Under 17 are fielded.

Kit Evolution 

Similar to other sport teams in Qormi, the team dons yellow and black strips. An alternative colour is the club's traditional green.

Current squad 2019/20

See also
Maltese National Hockey League
European Hockey Federation
Sliema Hotsticks Hockey Club

References

External links 
Official website (in Maltese)
Qormi Hockey Club's Gallery

1971 establishments in Malta
Qormi
Field hockey clubs in Malta
Field hockey clubs established in 1971